Operation Family Secrets was an investigation by the Federal Bureau of Investigation (FBI) into mob-related crimes in Chicago. The FBI called it one of the most successful investigations of organized crime that it had ever conducted.

The investigation and trial was accurately dubbed "Family Secrets" because of the betrayal from within the Calabrese family. The son, Frank Calabrese Jr., and brother, Nick Calabrese, of Chicago Outfit mob hitman Frank Calabrese Sr. provided testimony that was instrumental to the success of Operation Family Secrets. The investigation led to indictments of 14 defendants who were affiliated with the Chicago Outfit, which has been one of the most prolific organized crime enterprises in the United States.

The most heinous of their crimes investigated were 18 murders and one attempted murder between 1970 and 1986. All of the murders and the other crimes charged to the defendants were allegedly committed to further the Outfit's illegal activities, such as loansharking and bookmaking, and protecting the enterprise from law enforcement.

Operation Family Secrets was a milestone in the FBI's battle against organized crime in Chicago. It is said to have had a significant effect on the operations of the Chicago Outfit. However, it did not end the Outfit's reign in Chicago.

Murders
The following list is of the murders committed as objectives of the Chicago Outfit that were investigated in Operation Family Secrets:

Investigation

Frank Jr.'s letter to FBI
The investigation began on July 27, 1998 when Frank Calabrese Jr., wrote a letter to the FBI saying he wanted help to put his father in jail. The letter was sent without warning from the federal correctional facility in Milan, Michigan, where both Frank Jr. and Frank Sr. had been incarcerated since 1995, when four members of the Calabrese family had been sentenced for collecting "juice loans" and racketeering an auto repair business. In the letter, Frank Jr. requested a face-to-face meeting in which he planned to give the FBI information about his father's crimes, business activities of the Chicago Outfit street crews, and the murder of John Fecorotta: "This is no game. I feel I have to help keep this sick man locked up forever."

He and his father had had rough patches in their relationship over the years. He had stolen hundreds of thousands of dollars in cash from his father, which he blew on a cocaine addiction and bad business decisions. Afterward, his father allegedly put a gun to his son's head and threatened to kill him. That and many other instances of Frank Sr.'s abuse and poor fathering contributed to Frank Jr.'s desire to help the FBI bring him down. He volunteered to record conversations that he had with his father while they were imprisoned. He wore a pair of headphones around his neck fit by the FBI with a hidden microphone to record conversations between the father and son.

It was not difficult for Frank Jr. to direct his conversations in the prison courtyard and recreational facilities with his father toward information that would benefit the FBI's rapidly assembling investigation. Frank Sr. bragged to his son about past criminal activities.

Nick's co-operation with federal agents
Federal agents Michael Maseth, Tom Bourgeois, and Michael Hartnett were assigned to the investigation. They began to put together pieces of information on the Fecarotta murder. Newspapers reported that Calabrese had been confronted with DNA evidence implicating him in the 1986 mob hit of mob enforcer Fecarotta, prompting Nick Calabrese to cooperate with law enforcement in the probe.

Trial
The FBI, in April 2005, turned in a 43-page indictment that was created by the "Family Secrets" investigation. "Family Secrets" was unprecedented for naming the entire Chicago Outfit as a criminal enterprise. Assistant US Attorneys Mitchell Mars, John Scully, and T. Markus Funk would represent the United States in the case. After more than two years, the trial began in June 2007. Judge James Zagel heard the case.

The evidence was presented between June 28, 2007 and August 8, 2007. The trial included testimony from more than 125 witnesses and over 200 pieces of evidence. For Calabrese Sr., James Marcello, Joseph "The Clown" Lombardo, Paul "The Indian" Schiro, and Anthony "Twan" Doyle, who were the five main defendants, the trial ended on August 30.

All five men were found guilty on all counts for conspiracy and criminal acts of racketeering. Of the other nine defendants, six pleaded guilty, two died before trial (Frank Saladino and Michael Ricci), and one (Frank "The German" Schweihs [sic]) was too ill to stand trial. Calabrese Sr., was represented by Joe "the Shark" Lopez, who had been involved in many organized crime trials.

Sentencing
On September 10, 2007, Lombardo was convicted of racketeering, extortion, loan sharking and murder. On September 27, 2007, the same jury found Lombardo guilty of the 1974 Seifert murder. In 2009, Lombardo, seated in a wheelchair, was sentenced to life in prison for the convictions.

On February 5, 2009, Marcello was sentenced to life imprisonment for the Spilotro murders, and United States District Judge James Zagel, agreeing with the presentation made by federal prosecutor Markus Funk, also found Marcello responsible for the D'Andrea murder as well, even though the jury had deadlocked on that count.

On January 28, 2009, Judge Zagel sentenced Frank Calabrese, then 71, to life in prison for his crimes and called the acts he had committed "unspeakable". On finding prosecutors had proven the murder allegations, the judge sentenced Calabrese for all 13 slayings.

On March 26, 2009, Nick Calabrese was sentenced to 12 years and four months in prison, after several of his government cooperation. Upon sentencing Calabrese, Zagel told him, "I think what you did does make amends by allowing penalties to be paid for the murders of others and for allowing families to know how and why their [loved ones] died." Calabrese had said, "I can't go back and undo what I done ... I stand before you a different man, a changed man." Zagel doubts Calabrese will ever truly be free. No matter how long he lives or in what protected place it will be, Calabrese will always have to look over his shoulder. Zagel said, "The organization whose existence you testified to will not forgive or relent in their pursuit of you."

References

Federal Bureau of Investigation operations
Operations against organized crime in the United States
Chicago Outfit
Organized crime in Chicago
American Mafia events